Middletown Springs is the primary village and a census-designated place (CDP) in the town of Middletown Springs, Rutland County, Vermont, United States. As of the 2020 census, it had a population of 194, out of 794 in the entire town.

The CDP is in western Rutland County, at the geographic center of the town of Middletown Springs. Vermont Route 140 passes through the center of the village, leading east  to Wallingford and northwest  to Poultney. Vermont Route 133 leads south from the village center  to Pawlet.

Middletown Springs is within the Taconic Mountains, in the valley of the Poultney River, which forms the southern edge of the CDP. The river flows west and north to the south end of Lake Champlain on the Vermont/New York border.

References 

Populated places in Rutland County, Vermont
Census-designated places in Rutland County, Vermont
Census-designated places in Vermont